Monsters, Inc. is a 2001 platform game based on the 2001 film of the same name released for Game Boy Color, Game Boy Advance, and PlayStation 2. The Game Boy Color and Game Boy Advance versions of the game were released in October 26, 2001 in North America and in February 1, 2002 in Europe. The PlayStation 2 version was only released in North America in March 20, 2002. The Game Boy Advance version was also released on a Twin Pack cartridge bundled with Finding Nemo in 2005.

Gameplay

PlayStation 2 version
Monsters, Inc. is a 3D platformer. Players control James P. "Sulley" Sullivan through 8 levels based on environments from the movie, including the scream factory Monsters Incorporated, the streets of Monstropolis, Sulley's apartment, the Himalayas, and more. In each level, the main goals might include picking up one or more special items, or finding the exit. Sulley has to make his way across platforms, ladders and conveyor belts by jumping, climbing, flipping switches and pushing crates around. To attack enemies, Sulley can use his tail to whip opponents. The game has no lives system, so levels can be attempted an unlimited number of times.

Each level also includes a number of collectibles and special tasks. There are 100 discarded screams to pick up; finding a certain percentage of them unlocks mini-game bonus levels. There are also five scream canisters to find and a small challenge involving scaring five mice within a time limit. If both are completed, clips from the movie are unlocked.

Reception

The Game Boy Advance and PlayStation 2 versions received "mixed" reviews according to the review aggregation website Metacritic. In Japan, where the former version was ported and published by Tomy on March 1, 2002, Famitsu gave it a score of 19 out of 40.

Douglass C. Perry of IGN called the gameplay of the latter console version "formulaic, obvious, and occasionally cute." Game Informer said of the same console version, "It's tough to be impressed by a game based on a Pixar movie, when it's a given Pixar's CG is 2,000 times better than anything a current game system could offer."

Andrei Allupului of PlanetPS2 was scathing toward the same console version, saying, "It's also not an overly difficult game, nor an overly long game, nor an overly attractive game, nor an overly fun game." Ryan Davis of GameSpot cited the issues of the same console version, saying that it "will likely bore the older players and frustrate the young."

References

External links

2001 video games
3D platform games
Disney video games
Game Boy Advance games
Game Boy Color games
Kodiak Interactive games
Monsters, Inc. video games
Natsume (company) games
PlayStation 2 games
RenderWare games
Single-player video games
Sony Interactive Entertainment games
THQ games
Tomy games
Vicarious Visions games
Video games based on films
Video games developed in Japan
Video games developed in the United States
Video games scored by Iku Mizutani